The following is a list of notable musicians who do merengue music.

Dominican and Caribbean
Aguakate
Amarfis
Elvis Crespo 
Fulanito
Fefita La Grande
Juan Espinola
Juan Luis Guerra
Ricardo Gutierrez
Tatico Henriquez
Julio Alberto Hernández
Eddy Herrera 
La India Canela
Krisspy
Limi-T 21 
Ñico Lora
Grupo Mania
Kinito Mendez 
Omega
Ramón Orlando
Chichi Peralta 
Geovanny Polanco
El Prodigio
Milly Quezada
Toño Rosario
Francisco Ulloa
Cuco Valoy
Sergio Vargas
Wilfrido Vargas
Johnny Ventura 
Fernando Villalona
Grupo Climax

Venezuelan merengue
Los Cañoneros

References

Merengue